Herman Jeremiassen (born 1851 in Hviteseid, died 1943) was a Norwegian ship-owner and politician.

Personal life
Herman Jeremiassen was born in Hviteseid to teacher's seminary leader Knut Johan Jeremiassen and Ingeborg Ellse, née Helseth. The family moved to Drammen around 1855. Herman and his brother Johan Jeremiassen later moved to Porsgrund.

Jeremiassen married Alice Resch, daughter of captain Hagbarth Resch. Alice's sister Marie married Jørgen Christian Knudsen, whose sister Serine married Herman's brother Johan.

Career
Like his brother, Herman Jeremiassen was a notable ship-owner.

As a politician Herman Jeremiassen was mayor of Porsgrund municipality from 1900 to 1907. He was a conservative. During his time as mayor, Porsgrunn got its coat of arms, a power plant among other things.

References

1851 births
1943 deaths
Norwegian businesspeople in shipping
Politicians from Porsgrunn
Mayors of places in Telemark